James Nicolson (1832-1889) was Dean  of Brechin from 1874 until his death on 25 January 1889.

Nicolson was educated Marischal College, Aberdeen and ordained in 1857. His first posts was Curate at St Mary Magdalene, Dundee and Chaplain to the Bishop of Brechin.  After that he was the incumbent at St Salvador, Dundee, which he had helped to found in 1856 together with Alexander Penrose Forbes, Bishop Of Brechin.

Notes

Scottish Episcopalian clergy
Alumni of the University of Aberdeen
Deans of Brechin
1889 deaths
1832 births
People associated with Dundee